Hirotaka Asahisa (朝久 裕貴, born 21 June 1996) is a Japanese kickboxer, currently competing in the super featherweight division of K-1 and Wu Lin Feng. He is the current WLF Super featherweight champion. A professional competitor since 2012, Asahisa is the 2018 Wu Lin Feng Super Featherweight tournament winner and the 2022 K-1 Super Featherweight World Grand Prix runner-up.

As of July 2021, Combat Press ranks him as the #3 bantamweight in the world. He's been ranked in the top ten since November 2020.

Kickboxing career

Early career
Asahisa made his professional debut against Eiko Kamikawa at Pound for Pound vol.1 on November 24, 2012. He won the fight by a second-round knockout.

Asahisa was scheduled to face KOUMA at M-fight - Suk WEERASAKRECK II on June 16, 2013. He suffered his first professional loss, losing by unanimous decision. All three judges scored the bout 29–28 for KOUMA.

Asahisa rebounded from his first loss with a first-round knockout of Yuki Miyazaki at MAJKF KICK GUTS 2014 on June 16, 2014.

Krush
Asahisa made his Krush debut against Shoya Masumoto at Krush.49 on January 4, 2015. He lost the fight by a third-round technical knockout, succumbing to a series of punches with 10 seconds left in the bout.

Asahisa was scheduled to face Kento Ito at Krush.52 on March 14, 2015. He won the fight by majority decision.

Asahisa was scheduled to face Hikaru Fujihashi at Krush.54 on May 4, 2015. He won the fight by unanimous decision, with scores of 29–28, 29–28 and 30–28.

Asahisa was scheduled to fight a rematch with Shoya Masumoto at Krush.56 on August 14, 2015. Masumoto was once again victorious, winning the fight by majority decision. Two of the judges scored the fight 29–28 in his favor, while the third judge scored it as a 28–28 draw.

Asahisa was scheduled to face the undefeated Kaito Ozawa at Krush.59 on October 4, 2015. He won the closely contested bout by majority decision, with scores of 30–29, 30–29 and 29–29.

Asahisa was scheduled to fight Tatsuya Oiwa at Krush.62 on January 17, 2016. He won the fight by unanimous decision, with scores of 30–28, 30–27 and 30–27.

Asahisa was scheduled to face Sano Tenma at Krush.64 on March 20, 2016. Tenma came into the fight undefeated, on an 11-fight winning streak. Asahisa won the fight by unanimous decision, with scores of 30–29, 30–28 and 30–28.

Asahisa made his K-1 debut against Yuta Otaki at K-1 World GP 2016 -57.5kg World Tournament on November 3, 2016. He won the fight by unanimous decision, with all three judges scoring the fight 30–27.

Wu Lin Feng

Super Featherweight tournament
Asahisa made his Wu Lin Feng debut against Zhao Chongyang at Wu Lin Feng 2017: Kung Fu VS Muay Thai on March 4, 2017, in the super featherweight tournament round of 16. Asahisa beat Chongyang by unanimous decision, and won the quarterfinal bout against Zhao Fuxiang in the same manner.

Two months later, on May 6, 2021, Asahisa was scheduled to face Ncedo Gomba in the tournament semifinal. He won the fight by unanimous decision, and advanced to the tournament finals, where he faced Javier Hernandez. Hernandez won the final by a unanimous decision, after an extra round was fought.

Between the tournaments
Asahisa was scheduled to fight a rematch with Zhao Chongyang at Wu Lin Feng 2017: World Championship Xi'an on September 2, 2017. He won the fight by unanimous decision.

Asahisa was scheduled to fight Shoya Masumoto, for the third time in his professional career, at Krush.82 on November 5, 2017. Masumoto won the fight by unanimous decision, with scores of 30–27, 30–27 and 29–27, bringing his overall score against Asahisa to 0–3.

Asahisa was scheduled to face Li Ning at Wu Lin Feng 2018: World Championship in Shenzhen on February 3, 2018. He won the fight by decision.

WLF Super Featherweight champion
Asahisa participated in the 2018 WLF Super Featherweight tournament, held on March 10, 2018. He was scheduled to face Chen Wende in the quarterfinals, and won by a first-round knockout. Following a decision win against Djany Fiorenti in the semifinals, Asahisa faced Zhao Chongyang in the tournament finals, for the third time in his career. He held two decision wins against Chongyang heading into the bout. Their third meeting was ruled a draw after the first three rounds were fought, and accordingly went into an extra round. Asahisa knocked Chongyang out with a flying knee, 21 seconds into the extension round.

Asahisa was scheduled to face the reigning Krush Featherweight champion Haruma Saikyo in the quarterfinals of the 2nd K-1 Featherweight Championship Tournament, held on June 17, 2018. Saikyo won the fight by majority decision, with two of the judges scoring the fight 29–28 and 30–29 in his favor, while the third judge scored the fight 29–28 for Asahisa.

Asahisa was scheduled to face Fang Feida in a non–title bout at Wu Lin Feng 2018: WLF -67kg World Cup 2018-2019 4th Round on October 6, 2018. He won the fight by a second-round technical knockout.

Asahisa made his first title defense against Wang Junyu at Wu Lin Feng 2019: WLF World Cup 2018-2019 Final on January 19, 2019. He won the fight by a fourth-round flying knee knockout.

Asahisa returned from a twelve-month layoff to face Zhu Shuai in a non-title bout at Wu Lin Feng 2020: WLF World Cup 2019-2020 Final on January 11, 2020. He lost the fight by unanimous decision.

Asahisa was scheduled to face Tatsuya Oiwa at K-1 World GP 2020 in Fukuoka on November 3, 2020. He won the fight by unanimous decision, with all three judges scoring the bout 30–27 in his favor.

Asahisa was scheduled to face MOMOTARO at K-1 World GP 2021: Yokohamatsuri on September 20, 2021. He won the fight by a first-round knockout. Asahisa knocked Momotaro down with a left hook, with 30 seconds left in the round. He followed this up with a second left hook at the 2:59 minute mark, which left Momotaro unable to beat the eight count.

Asahisa was scheduled to face Yuta Murakoshi at K-1: K'Festa 5 on April 3, 2022. Asahisa won by knockout in the first round, he knocked down his opponent with a high kick and forced the referee to stop the action when he floored Murakoshi for the second time with a jumping knee.

K-1

K-1 Super Featherweight Grand Prix
On June 15, 2022, it was announced that Asahisa would be one of eight participants in the 2022 K-1 Super Featherweight World Grand Prix, held to fill the throne left vacant by Takeru Segawa. Asahisa was booked to face Nakrob Fairtex in the quarterfinals of the one-day tournament, which was held at K-1 World GP 2022 Yokohamatsuri on 	September 11, 2022. He made quick work of his opponent, stopping him with a left hook to the body 44 seconds into the fight. Asahisa faced the one-time Krush Super Featherweight title challenger Tomoya Yokoyama in the tournament semifinals. He needed just 37 seconds to knock Yokoyama down twice, which resulted in a technical knockout victory for him under the K-1 Grand Prix rules. Asahisa failed to capture the vacant title however, as he suffered a narrow unanimous decision loss to Leona Pettas in the tournament finals.

Titles and accomplishments
Wu Lin Feng
 2017 Wu Lin Feng -60kg World Tournament Runner-up
 2018 Wu Lin Feng -60kg Championship Tournament Winner
 2018 Wu Lin Feng -60kg Champion (One defense)
K-1
2022 K-1 Super Featherweight World Grand Prix runner-up

Kickboxing record
{{Kickboxing record start||norec=y|title=Kickboxing record|record=25 Wins (10 (T)KO's), 8 Losses, 0 Draw, 0 No Contest}}

|-  style="text-align:center; background:#fbb;"
| 2022-09-11 || Loss || align=left| Leona Pettas  ||  K-1 World GP 2022 Yokohamatsuri, Tournament Final|| Yokohama, Japan || Decision (Unanimous) || 3 || 3:00 
|-
! style=background:white colspan=9 |

|-  style="text-align:center; background:#cfc;"
| 2022-09-11 || Win || align=left| Tomoya Yokoyama ||  K-1 World GP 2022 Yokohamatsuri, Tournament Semifinals|| Yokohama, Japan || TKO (Two knockdowns) || 1 || 0:37

|-  style="text-align:center; background:#cfc;"
| 2022-09-11 || Win || align=left| Nakrob Fairtex ||  K-1 World GP 2022 Yokohamatsuri, Tournament Quarterfinals  || Yokohama, Japan || KO (Left hook to the body)  || 1 || 0:44 
|-
|- style="background:#cfc" 
| 2022-04-03 || Win ||align=left| Yuta Murakoshi || K-1: K'Festa 5 || Tokyo, Japan || KO (Jumping knee) || 1 ||1:42
|-  style="background:#cfc;"
| 2021-09-20 ||Win||align=left| MOMOTARO || K-1 World GP 2021: Yokohamatsuri || Yokohama, Japan || KO (Left hook) || 1 || 2:59
|-  style="background:#cfc;"
| 2020-11-03|| Win ||align=left| Tatsuya Oiwa || K-1 World GP 2020 in Fukuoka|| Fukuoka, Japan || Decision (Unanimous) || 3|| 3:00
|-  style="background:#fbb;"
| 2020-01-11||Loss ||align=left| Zhu Shuai || Wu Lin Feng 2020: WLF World Cup 2019-2020 Final || Zhuhai, China ||Decision (Unanimous)  || 3 || 3:00
|-  style="background:#cfc;"
| 2019-01-19|| Win ||align=left| Wang Junyu || Wu Lin Feng 2019: WLF World Cup 2018-2019 Final   || Haikou, China  || KO (Flying Knee) || 4 || 
|-
! style=background:white colspan=9 |
|-  style="background:#cfc;"
| 2018-10-06|| Win ||align=left| Fang Feida || Wu Lin Feng 2018: WLF -67kg World Cup 2018-2019 4th Round || Shangqiu,  China || TKO || 2 || 0:51
|-  style="background:#Fbb;"
| 2018-06-17|| Loss ||align=left| Haruma Saikyo || K-1 World GP 2018: 2nd Featherweight Championship Tournament, Quarter Finals|| Saitama, Japan || Decision (Split) || 3 || 3:00
|-  style="background:#cfc;"
| 2018-03-10|| Win ||align=left| Zhao Chongyang || Wu Lin Feng 2018: -60kg World Championship Tournament, Final || Jiaozuo, China || Ext.R KO (Flying Knee) || 4 || 0:21
|-
! style=background:white colspan=9 |
|-  style="background:#cfc;"
| 2018-03-10|| Win ||align=left| Djany Fiorenti || Wu Lin Feng 2018: -60kg World Championship Tournament, Semi Finals || Jiaozuo, China || Decision || 3 || 3:00
|-  style="background:#cfc;"
| 2018-03-10|| Win ||align=left| Chen Wende || Wu Lin Feng 2018: -60kg World Championship Tournament, Quarter Finals || Jiaozuo, China || KO (punches) || 1 ||
|-  style="background:#cfc;"
| 2018-02-03|| Win ||align=left| Li Ning || Wu Lin Feng 2018: World Championship in Shenzhen || Shenzhen, China || Decision || 3 || 3:00
|-  style="background:#Fbb;"
| 2017-11-05|| Loss||align=left| Shoya Masumoto || Krush.82 || Tokyo, Japan || Decision (Unanimous)|| 3 || 3:00
|-  style="background:#cfc;"
| 2017-09-02|| Win ||align=left| Zhao Chongyang || Wu Lin Feng 2017: World Championship Xi'an || Xi'an, China || Decision (Unanimous)|| 3 || 3:00
|-  style="background:#Fbb;"
| 2017-05-06|| Loss ||align=left| Javier Hernandez || Wu Lin Feng 2017: 60 kg World Tournament, Final || Zhengzhou, China || Ext.R Decision (Unanimous) || 4 || 3:00
|-
! style=background:white colspan=9 |
|-  style="background:#cfc;"
| 2017-05-06|| Win ||align=left| Ncedo Gomba || Wu Lin Feng 2017: 60 kg World Tournament Semi Finals || Zhengzhou, China || Decision (Unanimous)|| 3 || 3:00
|-  style="background:#cfc;"
| 2017-03-04|| Win ||align=left| Zhao Fuxiang || Wu Lin Feng 2017: 60 kg World Tournament, Quarter FInals || Zhengzhou, China || Decision (Unanimous)|| 3 || 3:00
|-  style="background:#cfc;"
| 2017-03-04|| Win ||align=left| Zhao Chongyang || Wu Lin Feng 2017: 60 kg World Tournament, 1/8 FInals || Zhengzhou, China || Decision (Unanimous)|| 3 || 3:00
|-  style="background:#cfc;"
| 2016-11-03|| Win ||align=left| Yuta Otaki || K-1 World GP 2016 -57.5kg World Tournament || Tokyo, Japan || Decision (Unanimous)|| 3 || 3:00
|-  style="background:#cfc;"
| 2016-06-04|| Win ||align=left| Li Ning || Wu Lin Feng vs Krush || China || Decision || 3 || 3:00
|-  style="background:#cfc;"
| 2016-03-20|| Win ||align=left| Tenma Sano || Krush.64 || Tokyo, Japan || Decision (Unanimous) || 3 || 3:00
|-  style="background:#cfc;"
| 2016-01-17|| Win ||align=left| Tatsuya Oiwa || Krush.62 || Tokyo, Japan || Decision (Unanimous)|| 3 || 3:00
|-  style="background:#cfc;"
| 2015-10-04|| Win ||align=left| Kaito Ozawa || Krush.59  || Tokyo, Japan || Decision (Majority)|| 3 || 3:00
|-  style="background:#FFBBBB;"
| 2015-08-14|| Loss ||align=left| Shoya Masumoto || Krush.56  || Tokyo, Japan || Decision (Majority) || 3 || 3:00
|-  style="background:#cfc;"
| 2015-05-04|| Win ||align=left| Hikaru Fujihashi || Krush.54  || Tokyo, Japan || Decision (Unanimous)|| 3 || 3:00
|-  style="background:#cfc;"
| 2015-03-14|| Win ||align=left| Kento Ito || Krush.52  || Tokyo, Japan || Decision (Majority)|| 3 || 3:00
|-  style="background:#FFBBBB;"
| 2015-01-04|| Loss ||align=left| Shoya Masumoto || Krush.49  || Tokyo, Japan || TKO (Punches) || 3 || 2:50
|-  style="background:#cfc;"
| 2014-08-10|| Win ||align=left| Yuki Miyazaki || MAJKF KICK GUTS 2014|| Tokyo, Japan || KO || 1 ||
|-  style="background:#fbb;"
| 2013-06-16|| Loss||align=left| KOUMA || M-fight - Suk WEERASAKRECK II|| Tokyo, Japan || Decision (Unanimous) || 3 || 3:00
|-  style="background:#cfc;"
| 2012-11-24|| Win ||align=left| Eiko Kamikawa || Pound for Pound vol.1 || Kyushu, Japan || KO || 2 || 
|-
| colspan=9 | Legend:    

|-  style="background:#FFBBBB;"
| 2014-07-21|| Loss || align=left| Tenma Sano || K-1 Koshien 2014 Tournament, Semi Final || Tokyo, Japan || Decision (Unanimous) || 1 ||2:00
|-  style="background:#cfc;"
| 2014-07-21|| Win || align=left| Tatsuya Sawaya  || K-1 Koshien 2014 Tournament, Quarter Final || Tokyo, Japan || Extra Round Decision (Split) || 2 ||2:00
|-  style="background:#cfc;"
| 2014-07-21|| Win || align=left| Shishido || K-1 Koshien 2014 Tournament, Second Round || Tokyo, Japan || Decision (Unanimous) || 1 ||2:00
|-  style="background:#cfc;"
| 2014-07-21|| Win || align=left| Naoki Ueda || K-1 Koshien 2014 Tournament, First Round || Tokyo, Japan || Decision (Unanimous) || 1 ||2:00
|-  style="background:#cfc;"
| 2011-06-19|| Win || align=left| Jun Kato || M-1 Amateur Muay Thai Kyushu 3, -50kg Tournament Final || Fukuoka, Japan || Decision (Unanimous) || 2 || 2:00
|-  style="background:#cfc;"
| 2011-06-19|| Win || align=left| Riku Kojima || M-1 Amateur Muay Thai Kyushu 3, -50kg Tournament Semi Final || Fukuoka, Japan || Decision (Unanimous) || 2 || 2:00
|-  style="background:#cfc;"
| 2011-06-19|| Win || align=left| Yu || M-1 Amateur Muay Thai Kyushu 3, -50kg Tournament Quarter Final || Fukuoka, Japan || Decision (Unanimous) || 2 || 2:00
|-  style="background:#FFBBBB;"
| 2011-01-10|| Loss || align=left| Katsuki Nogami || M-1 Amateur Muay Thai Kyushu 2 || Fukuoka, Japan || Decision  || 2 || 2:00
|-
| colspan=9 | Legend''':

See also
 List of male kickboxers

References

Living people
1996 births
Japanese male kickboxers
Bantamweight kickboxers
People from Ukiha, Fukuoka
Sportspeople from Fukuoka Prefecture